is a Japanese football player who plays for Sestao River Club.

Playing career
He spent 4 years on loan at Avispa Fukuoka during which time he had spells as club captain, before returning to his parent club Gamba Osaka at the start of the 2012 season.

National team career
On 7 May 2015, Japan's coach Vahid Halilhodžić called him for a two-days training camp. On 23 July 2015, he was called again for the upcoming 2015 EAFF East Asian Cup.

Club statistics

1 includes J. League Championship and Japanese Super Cup appearances.

Reserves performance

Last Updated: 30 November 2019

National team statistics

Honors
Gamba Osaka
J1 League - 2014
J2 League - 2013
Emperor's Cup - 2014, 2015
J.League Cup - 2014
Japanese Super Cup - 2015

FC Tokyo
J.League Cup - 2020

References

External links
 
 

1986 births
Living people
Association football people from Osaka Prefecture
People from Kawachinagano
Japanese footballers
Japan international footballers
J1 League players
J2 League players
J3 League players
Gamba Osaka players
Tokushima Vortis players
Omiya Ardija players
Avispa Fukuoka players
Sanfrecce Hiroshima players
FC Tokyo players
FC Tokyo U-23 players
Association football defenders
Sestao River footballers